Askersby is a locality situated in Örebro Municipality, Örebro County, Sweden with 243 inhabitants in 2010.

References 

Örebro
Populated places in Örebro Municipality